Somers Township is one of the twelve townships of Preble County, Ohio, United States.  The 2000 census found 4,245 people in the township, 1,943 of whom lived in the unincorporated portions of the township.

Geography
Located in the southern part of the county, it borders the following townships:
Gasper Township - north
Lanier Township - northeast corner
Gratis Township - east
Wayne Township, Butler County - southeast corner
Milford Township, Butler County - south
Oxford Township, Butler County - southwest corner
Israel Township - west
Dixon Township - northwest corner

The village of Camden is located in northern Somers Township.

Name and history
Named for Commodore Richard Somers, it is the only Somers Township statewide.

Government
The township is governed by a three-member board of trustees, who are elected in November of odd-numbered years to a four-year term beginning on the following January 1. Two are elected in the year after the presidential election and one is elected in the year before it. There is also an elected township fiscal officer, who serves a four-year term beginning on April 1 of the year after the election, which is held in November of the year before the presidential election. Vacancies in the fiscal officership or on the board of trustees are filled by the remaining trustees.

References

External links
County website

Townships in Preble County, Ohio
Townships in Ohio